Enrique Brol (born 9 October 1978) is a Guatemalan sports shooter. He competed in the men's double trap event at the 2016 Summer Olympics.

References

External links
 

1978 births
Living people
Guatemalan male sport shooters
Olympic shooters of Guatemala
Shooters at the 2016 Summer Olympics
Place of birth missing (living people)
Pan American Games bronze medalists for Guatemala
Shooters at the 2015 Pan American Games
Pan American Games medalists in shooting
Medalists at the 2015 Pan American Games
20th-century Guatemalan people
21st-century Guatemalan people